In the third season of the Balkan International Basketball League, ten participants from the Republic of Macedonia, Bulgaria, Romania, Serbia, Montenegro and the new represented countries Bosnia and Herzegovina and Croatia has competed.

Teams

Format

Regular season
In the regular season the teams will be divided into two groups, each containing five teams. Each team plays every other team in its group at home and away. The two teams that finished at the top of their group advance to the final four. The teams that finish second and third in their group advance to the quarterfinals.
The opening game has been played on October 2, 2010 and the last matchday has been played on 1–2 May 2011.

Quarterfinals
The teams that finished second in their home played against the third placed teams in the other group in a Best-Of-3 series with home advantage.

Final four
The four remaining teams play a semifinal match and the winners of those advance to the final. The losers play in a third-place playoff.
The final four has been hosted at the Jasmin Sports Hall, Kavadarci, Republic of Macedonia.

Regular season

Group A

Group B

Quarterfinals
First legs were on March 22 and 23; Second legs were on March 29 and 30; Third leg was on April 6

Final four

External links
 BIBL official webpage
 Balkan League standings and livescores

2010-11
2010–11 in European basketball leagues
2010–11 in Serbian basketball
2010–11 in Republic of Macedonia basketball
2010–11 in Romanian basketball
2010–11 in Bulgarian basketball
2010–11 in Montenegrin basketball
2010–11 in Bosnia and Herzegovina basketball
2010–11 in Croatian basketball